Tissue may refer to:

Biology
 Tissue (biology), an ensemble of similar (or dissimilar in structure but same in origin) cells that together carry out a specific function
 Triphosa haesitata, a species of geometer moth ("tissue moth") found in North America
 Triphosa dubitata, a species of geometer moth ("tissue") found in Afro-Eurasia

Paper products
 Tissue paper, a type of thin, gauzy translucent paper used for wrapping and cushioning items
 Facial tissue, tissue paper used for cleaning the face
 Japanese tissue, tissue paper from Japan made of vegetable fibers
 Toilet paper, tissue paper used for cleaning the anus
 Wrapping tissue, tissue paper used for wrapping and cushioning items

Other
 Aerial tissue, an acrobatic art form and one of the circus arts
 "The Tissue (Tomaranai Seishun)", a 2011 song by Shiritsu Ebisu Chugaku